Harold L. Colburn Jr. (October 2, 1925 – May 1, 2012) was an American physician and politician who served in the New Jersey General Assembly from the 8th Legislative District from 1984 to 1995.

Born in Orange, Coburn attended Montclair High School in nearby Montclair. After graduating in 1947 from Princeton University, he earned his medical degree at Albany Medical College. Colburn, a practicing dermatologist, served on the Burlington County, New Jersey Board of Chosen Freeholders from 1971 to 1984 and represented the 8th Legislative District in the New Jersey General Assembly from 1984 to 1995.

A resident of Mount Laurel, Coburn died on May 1, 2012, in Moorestown, New Jersey at age 86.

References

1925 births
2012 deaths
Albany Medical College alumni
American dermatologists
County commissioners in New Jersey
Montclair High School (New Jersey) alumni
Republican Party members of the New Jersey General Assembly
People from Mount Laurel, New Jersey
People from Orange, New Jersey
Physicians from New Jersey
Politicians from Burlington County, New Jersey
Princeton University alumni